Steven Marsters (born 19 October 1999) is a Cook Islands international rugby league footballer who last played for the South Sydney Rabbitohs as a  or er in the NRL.

Background
Marsters is the younger cousin of current North Queensland Cowboys and former West Tigers player, Esan Marsters who has also represented the Cook Islands and New Zealand. He played his junior rugby league with the Thirroul Butchers and Mt Wellington Warriors and has represented the Cook Islands.

Career

2020
Marsters made his first grade debut in round 15 of the 2020 NRL season for South Sydney against Manly-Warringah, scoring a try in a 56–16 victory at ANZ Stadium.

2021
In round 9 of the 2021 NRL season, he made his first start of the year for South Sydney in a 50–0 loss against Melbourne at Stadium Australia.

On 8 October, Marsters was released by the South Sydney club.

2022
In the opening round of the 2021 Rugby League World Cup, Marsters scored a try in the Cook Islands victory over Wales but was taken from the field late in the second half with a knee injury.

References

External links
Rabbitohs profile

1999 births
Living people
Cook Island people of British descent
Cook Islands national rugby league team players
New Zealand sportspeople of Cook Island descent
New Zealand people of British descent
New Zealand rugby league players
Steven
Rugby league centres
Rugby league players from Auckland
South Sydney Rabbitohs players